Minuscule 569 (in the Gregory-Aland numbering), A 151 (in the Soden's numbering), is a Greek minuscule illuminated manuscript Gospel book, on parchment. It is dated by a Colophon to the year 1061. It was labelled by Scrivener as 475. The manuscript has complex contents.

Description 

The writing is in one column per page, 14 lines per page for text and 51 lines with a commentary. It contains breathings, sign of interrogative, abbreviations are frequent; the iota adscript occurs (e.g. article τῶι for τῷ), it has iotacistic errors; avoid hiatus (e.g. ἐγέννησε τὸν).

Some initial letters are in gold or colour. The biblical text is surrounded by a patristic commentary (catena); in the Gospel of Mark it is a commentary by Victorinus of Pettau. There is additional material from Epiphanius.

Text 

The Greek text of the codex is a representative of the Byzantine text-type with some alien readings. Aland did not place it in any Category. According to the Claremont Profile Method it represents the textual M27 group in Luke 1, Luke 10, and Luke 20.

History 
The manuscript was completed on 1 November 1061, by an unknown scribe. On folio 5 recto, Eugenius, a scribe, noticed, that in 1757 the manuscript was bought from Sophronius, a monk, in exchange for a promise to erect a chapel in honour of Saint Spyridon in the monastery of Saint Paul in Bulgaria.
Ἔτει αψνξ (1757) ἀπὸ χριστοῦ τήνδε τὴν βίβλον ἐκτησάμην ἀντ’ αὐτης οἰκοδομἦσαι ὑποσχόμενος τῷ δόντι μοι αὐτὴν Σοφρονίῳ ἱερομονάχῳ παρακκλ..... ἐν τῇ κέλλῃ αὐτοῦ τῇ κατὰ τὴν ..... τοῦ ἁγίου Παύλου ἐπονόματι τοῦ θαυματόυργου Σπυρίδωνος Εὐγένιος ἱεροδίακονος ὁ Βόλγαρις

Afterwards the manuscript belonged to the Załuski Library. In 1794 the whole collection was dispatched to Saint Petersburg. Since 1805 it has been held in the Imperial Public Library in Petersburg.

The manuscript was examined and briefly described by Eduard de Muralt (along with the codices 565-566, 568, 570-572, 574, 575, and 1567), but he did not collate any of its readings. In 1966 Kurt Treu examined the manuscript more thoroughly for the needs of textual criticism.

The manuscript is in the National Library of Russia (Gr. 72) in Saint Petersburg.

See also 

 List of New Testament minuscules
 Biblical manuscript
 Textual criticism

References

Further reading 

 Eduard de Muralt, Catalogue des manuscrits grecs de la Bibliothèque Impériale publique (Petersburg 1864), pp. 42–44.
 Kurt Treu, Die griechischen Handschriften des Neuen Testaments in der UdSSR; eine systematische Auswertung des Texthandschriften in Leningrad, Moskau, Kiev, Odessa, Tbiblisi und Erevan, Texte und Untersuchungen 91 (Berlin, 1966), pp. 54–57.

External links 

 Minuscule 569 at the Russian National Library

Greek New Testament minuscules
11th-century biblical manuscripts
Gospel Books
National Library of Russia collection